Columna leai is a species of tropical land snail, a terrestrial pulmonate gastropod mollusks in the family Achatinidae. This species is native to Gabon and São Tomé and Principe.

References
Zipcodezoo
Global Names
Worldwide Mollusc Species Data Base

Achatinidae
Gastropods described in 1866